Iryna Dmytrivna Farion (born 29 April 1964) is a Ukrainian linguist and politician. She is a Kandidat of Philological Sciences and a docent of the Department of Ukrainian Language at the Lviv Polytechnic (Institute of Humanitarian and Social Sciences).

Biography
Farion graduated from the Philology School of the Lviv University in 1987 with honors, while her name was entered in the book "Toiling glory of University". During the college years she was a member of a Communist Party of the Soviet Union (the only student being in the Communist Party).

In 1996 she defended her candidate dissertation. Since 2006 Farion became politically active balloting for People's Deputy of Ukraine mandate from the All-Ukrainian Union "Svoboda", of which she was a member since 2005. In 2006 Farion also successfully balloted to the regional council, while in 2010 she won in a majoritarian electoral district of Lviv.

Among her scientific works are four monographs and 200 articles. During 1998–2004 Farion headed language commission of Prosvita. Since 1998 she initiated and organized the annual competition among students "Language is a foundation of your life". In 2004 Farion became a laureate of Oleksa Hirnyk Prize (Oleksa Hirnyk). Farion publicly advocates the memory of Stepan Bandera, unity of the Ukrainian West and East based on a statist thinking.

In the 2012 parliamentary election Farion was elected into parliament after winning a constituency in Lviv Oblast.

In the 2014 parliamentary election Farion again tried to win a constituency seat in Lviv, but failed this time having finished third in her constituency with approximately 16% of votes.

In the July 2019 Ukrainian parliamentary election Farion again failed to return to parliament after finishing fifth with 10.35% of the vote in electoral district 116 in Lviv Oblast.

Public opinion
The biggest resonance occurred on 19 February 2010, when as part of the action "Affirm the state language!" (on the International Mother Language Day) Farion held a class devoted to the problem of national identity in the Kindergarten #67 (Lviv). During the classes in sharp form she condemned Russification of Ukrainian names. The same day unknown people posted online video of Farion on YouTube. The event became publicized in mass media and has caused mixed reviews. In particular, a People's Deputy of Ukraine from the Party of Regions Vadym Kolesnichenko appealed to the Prosecutor General of Ukraine to bring Iryna Farion criminally liable under Article 161 of the Criminal Code of Ukraine (concerning discrimination against children based on language and ethnicity), while the Ukrainian People's Party condemned the speech of Farion as a provocation against the Ukrainian language. On the other hand, the head of the party "Svoboda" Oleh Tyahnybok defended his colleague.

Awards
 Oleksa Hirnyk Prize (2004)
 Borys Hrinchenko Prize (2008)
 Diploma of the Ukrainian Orthodox Church of the Kyivan Patriarchate (2010) for book "Father Markiyan Shashkevych - the Ukrainian linguist"

Scientific publications
 Ukrainian family names of the Carpathian Lviv Region at the end of 18th – beginning of 19th centuries (with etymological dictionary). National Academy of Sciences of Ukraine, Institute of folklore studies. "Litopys". Lviv, 2001.
 Antroponymy system of the Upper Dniester region at the end of 18th – beginning of 19th centuries (family names). Franko State University. Lviv, 1996.

References

External links

 Profile at Svoboda website
 Official website

1964 births
Living people
Politicians from Lviv
Members of the Ukrainian Greek Catholic Church
Communist Party of the Soviet Union members
Svoboda (political party) politicians
Seventh convocation members of the Verkhovna Rada
Ukrainian philologists
Ukrainian nationalists
University of Lviv alumni
Linguists from Ukraine
Anti-Russian sentiment
Anti-Hungarian sentiment
20th-century Ukrainian politicians
20th-century Ukrainian women politicians
21st-century Ukrainian politicians
21st-century Ukrainian women politicians
Women philologists
Academic staff of Lviv Polytechnic
Women members of the Verkhovna Rada